"Throw That" is the fifth single of the hip hop supergroup Slaughterhouse from their second and final album Welcome to: Our House, which was released on August 28, 2012 via Shady Records and Interscope Records. The song features Eminem and production by himself and T-Minus. It was available to purchase on iTunes on August 21, 2012. "Throw That" entered the Billboard Hot 100 at number 98, making it both the group's and the album's most successful single.

Critical reception
David Jeffries of AllMusic highlighted it and reviewed it positively: "Still in the club, "Throw That" sits in the same booth but seeking 'higher mileage' with 'I throw this, I throw this dick on you girl' as its brutish hook." Slava Kuperstein of HipHopDX thought that the song was skippable. Phillip Mlynar of Spin was acclaiming noting that it expertly channels the disorderly energy of iconic late-'90s Tunnel-era anthems. Critic DJBooth noted that "You don’t have Em on the hook of a stripper anthem like Throw That without some hit aspirations" and opined that the song was "squeezed in a box."

Track listing
Digital single

Charts 
"Throw That" debuted and peaked at numbers 98 and 69 on the Billboard Hot 100 and Canadian Hot 100 charts respectively for the week of September 8, 2012.

Release history

References 

2012 singles
Slaughterhouse (group) songs
Eminem songs
Songs written by Eminem
Songs written by Royce da 5'9"
Song recordings produced by T-Minus (record producer)
Song recordings produced by Eminem
Songs written by T-Minus (record producer)
Songs written by Joe Budden
2012 songs
Shady Records singles
Songs written by Joell Ortiz